Carmela R. Abraham is an American neuroscientist who focuses on the study of Alzheimer’s disease.

Early life and education
Abraham earned her Bachelor of Science degree in Biology from Tel Aviv University and her PhD in Neuroscience from Harvard University. In 1990, Abraham was the recipient of The Neuroscience Education and Research Foundation Award for an Outstanding Promise as a Young Alzheimer Investigator. She was also the first Rappaport Scholar at the Center for Neurologic Diseases at Brigham and Women’s Hospital, and the recipient of the Zenith and Temple awards from the Alzheimer’s Association.

Career
Upon completing her PhD, Abraham accepted a position at Boston University School of Medicine (BU) as a Professor of Biochemistry and Pharmacology & Experimental Therapeutics. In this role, she was the recipient of a $200,000 grant from the Alzheimer's Association to support her research on drug therapy for Alzheimer’s disease. She used this funding to identify an anti-aging and anti-cancer protein that could reduce ageing in the brain. Her research team conducted a high throughput screen of 150,000 molecules, which led to the identification of three lead compounds that could prevent age-related diseases and overall healthier ageing. Following this, Abraham and her research team identified the importance of Klotho on the health of myelin and found small molecules that could form the basis for the development of therapeutic drugs.

During her time at BU, Abraham also co-founded Klogene Therapeutics, a pre-clinical stage gene therapy startup company developing novel treatments for neurodegenerative diseases. In 2016, she was awarded a $1.49 Million small business innovation research grant to be used towards the development of novel therapeutics for Alzheimer’s disease and other neurodegenerative diseases. She also discovered a molecule that reduced the formation of amyloid beta protein in cells grown in petri dishes, leading the possibility of  new therapy for Alzheimer's disease. In recognition of her "work on multiple sclerosis and the role of the life extension protein Klotho in the limited repair of white matter in the disease," Abraham was the recipient of a Massachusetts Neuroscience Consortium Award. She is also a member of the Society for Neuroscience, American Society for Neurochemistry, American Association of Neuropathologists, New York Academy of Science, International Society for Amyloidosis, and American Association for the Advancement of Science.

References

External links

Living people
Alzheimer's disease researchers
American women neuroscientists
Boston University School of Medicine faculty
Tel Aviv University alumni
Harvard Medical School alumni
Year of birth missing (living people)
American women academics
21st-century American women